Andhari river is a minor river of the Wainganga basin. It flows through the Chandrapur district of Maharashtra.  Meandering through the Tadoba forests, it gives its name to Tadoba Andhari Tiger Project.

References

Rivers of Maharashtra
Chandrapur district
Rivers of India